is a former Japanese football player and manager. He played for the Japan national team.

Club career
Tanaka was born in Saitama on November 2, 1955. After graduating from Meiji University, he joined Nippon Kokan (later NKK) in 1978. The club won the champions at 1980 JSL Cup and 1981 Emperor's Cup. From 1985, the club won the 2nd place for 3 years in a row and won the champions 1987 JSL Cup. He retired in 1988.

National team career
On July 15, 1982, Tanaka debuted for Japan national team against Romania. In November, he played at 1982 Asian Games. In 1983 and 1984, he played at 1984 Summer Olympics qualification. He played 20 games and scored 3 goals for Japan until 1984.

Coaching career
After retirement, Tanaka started coaching career at NKK in 1989. In 1993, he became a manager for Japan U-20 national team. At 1995 World Youth Championship, he led U-20 Japan to advanced to the quarter-finals. In 1995, he signed with Nagoya Grampus Eight and became a coach. In November 1997, he became a manager as Carlos Queiroz successor. He was sacked in April 1999. In 2001, he signed with J2 League club Shonan Bellmare and managed the club until 2002.

In 2016 Tanaka was appointed manager of Matsue City FC (松江シティフットボールクラブ), (renamed FC Kagura Shimane, FC神楽しまね, 2022)

Club statistics

National team statistics

Managerial statistics

References

External links

Japan National Football Team Database

1955 births
Living people
Meiji University alumni
Association football people from Saitama Prefecture
Japanese footballers
Japan international footballers
Japan Soccer League players
NKK SC players
Japanese football managers
J1 League managers
J2 League managers
Nagoya Grampus managers
Shonan Bellmare managers
Footballers at the 1982 Asian Games
Association football midfielders
Asian Games competitors for Japan